The M69 is a short metropolitan route in Johannesburg, South Africa.

Route 
The M69 begins at the R564 and ends at the M6.

References 

Streets and roads of Johannesburg
Metropolitan routes in Johannesburg